A Touch of the Sun, also released as No Secrets!, is a 1979 British-American comedy film directed by Peter Curran and starring Oliver Reed, Sylvaine Charlet, Peter Cushing and Wilfrid Hyde-White.

Premise
An American space capsule has crashed into an African dictatorship, whose ruler refuses to return it unless he is paid a large ransom. In response the Americans send in a secret agent to recover it.

Cast
 Oliver Reed – Captain Daniel Nelson
 Sylvaine Charlet – Natasha
 Peter Cushing – Commissioner Potts
 Keenan Wynn – General Spellman
 Edwin Manda – Emperor Sumumba
 Wilfrid Hyde-White – M-1
 Hilary Pritchard – Miss Funnypenny
 Bruce Boa – Jim Coburn
 A.M. Phiri – Chief Zawie
 Melvyn Hayes – Ginger Rogers
 Mike Cross – Fred Astaire
 Fred Carter – President P. Nuts
 Benjamin Shawa – Emperor's aide
 Friday Nyamba – Emperor's aide
 Jim Kenny – US operator

References

External links
 

1979 films
British spy comedy films
1970s spy comedy films
Films set in London
Films set in Africa
1979 comedy films
1970s English-language films
1970s British films